Mitromorpha gracilior is a species of sea snail, a marine gastropod mollusk in the family Mitromorphidae.

Description
The length of the shell varies between 4 mm and 5 mm.

The decussation not so deep as in Mitromorpha aspera, so that the surface is smoother, the tuberculation smaller. Sometimes the clathration of the body whorl is only seen on the upper portion, the longitudinal costulae becoming obsolete below.

Distribution

References

External links
 

gracilior
Gastropods described in 1884